The grey-headed chickadee or Siberian tit (Poecile cinctus), formerly Parus cinctus, is a passerine bird in the tit family Paridae. It is a widespread resident breeder throughout subarctic Scandinavia and the northern Palearctic, and also into North America in Alaska and the far northwest of Canada. It is a conifer specialist. It is resident, and most birds do not migrate. Curiously (with respect to its name), the bird has no grey on its head, which is black, white, and brown.

It is a fairly large tit, 13.5–14 cm long with a weight of 11–14.3 g. The head is dark brown with white cheeks, the mantle brown, the wing feathers blackish with pale fringes, and the underparts whitish with pale brown flanks.

Ecologists in Folldal, Hedmark, Norway found that the Siberian tits accounted for only 1% of all tit individuals in lichen-dominated pine forest in 2011 as opposed to 64% in 1982. This dramatic reduction is attributed to the interspecies competition with the willow tits and great tits, decreased vegetation due to climate change, and logging of old-growth trees which are preferred over new-growth trees .

Taxonomy
The grey-headed chickadee was described by the French polymath Georges-Louis Leclerc, Comte de Buffon in 1779 in his Histoire Naturelle des Oiseaux from a specimen collected in Siberia. The bird was also illustrated in a hand-coloured plate engraved by François-Nicolas Martinet in the Planches Enluminées D'Histoire Naturelle which was produced under the supervision of Edme-Louis Daubenton to accompany Buffon's text. Neither the plate caption nor Buffon's description included a scientific name but in 1783 the Dutch naturalist Pieter Boddaert coined the binomial name Parus cinctus in his catalogue of the Planches Enluminées. The grey-headed chickadee is now one of 15 species placed in the genus Poecile that was introduced by the German naturalist Johann Jakob Kaup in 1829. The genus name is from Ancient Greek poikilos "colourful". A related word poikilidos denoted an unidentified small bird. The specific epithet cinctus is Latin for "banded".

Formerly, the grey-headed chickadee was placed in the genus Parus with most other tits, but mtDNA cytochrome b sequence data and morphology suggest that separating Poecile more adequately expresses these birds' relationships.

Four subspecies are recognised:
 P. c. lapponicus (Lundahl, 1848) – Scandinavia to north European Russia
 P. c. cinctus (Boddaert, 1783) – northeast European Russia through Siberia to Kamchatka and north central Mongolia
 P. c. sayanus Sushkin, 1904 – south Siberia and northwest Mongolia
 P. c. lathami (Stephens, 1817) – north and west Alaska and northwest Canada

References

grey-headed chickadee
Birds of Scandinavia
Birds of Russia
Birds of North Asia
Native birds of Alaska
grey-headed chickadee
Holarctic birds